Ali Georges Tur (20 February 1889 – 26 September 1977) is a French architect. He is known for the hundreds of buildings he designed and built in Guadeloupe from 1929 to 1937 for a total amount of 72 million francs.

Early life 
Tur was born in Tunis (then under French protectorate). He graduated from Beaux-Arts de Paris.

Career 
He rebuilt much after Guadeloupe was damaged by the 1928 Okeechobee hurricane.

Death 
He died in the 16th arrondissement of Paris.

Works 

 Palace of the General Council (1935)

References 

1889 births
1977 deaths
20th-century French architects
Guadeloupean culture
People from Tunis
École des Beaux-Arts alumni